Clark Lake is a lake in the U.S. state of Washington.

Clark Lake was named after James Clarke.

See also
List of lakes in Washington

References

Lakes of Stevens County, Washington
Lakes of Washington (state)